Mohammad Mohsin called popularly as  Mohsin was an Odia actor, director and producer. In his movie career spanning more than 30 years across Bollywood, Odisha and West Bengal, he has acted and directed in many commercially successful movies. Mohsin made his first Bollywood debut in the movie Naiyya, in which he played the character of Karim.  Naiyya was produced and distributed by Rajshri Productions, which was a remake of Odia movie Shesha Shrabana, in which Mohsin played the character of a boat maker.
 
After working for a couple of years in Bollywood, Mohsin stepped in the acting scene of Odia film industry. In his initial days as an actor some of the characters which made Mohsin a favourite amongst movie goers were Bagha in Hisab Nikas, Raka in Maa-o-Mamata (1980), Mohsin played a school teacher who turns into a social reformist in the movie Balidan (1978). Mohsin's first directorial debut was with Odia movie, Phula Chandana (1982). Mohsin won Odisha State Film Awards for Best Director Best Director in the year 1982 for Phula Chandana.

Early life and background
Mohammad Mohsin was born in Cuttack, his schooling was in Sayeed Seminary High School, Cuttack, and completed his Bachelor in Arts from Ravenshaw College, Cuttack. Mohsin's passion for arts and drama caught him early from college and he contested and was elected as secretary of the Dramatic Society of Ravenshaw College. He continued his passion towards drama and theatre by performing in Annapurna Theatre, Cuttack. Mohsin continued his contribution to the Odia film industry by helping Prashanta Nanda as an assistant director. From there, Mohsin in the Odia film industry was marked in the field of acting, direction, story, screenplay, dialogue and as a producer. Mohsin has acted in more than 14 movies, and directed in 16 movies. Mohsin's most notable movies were Phoola Chandana (1982), Danda Balunga (1980), Jaga Hatare Pagha (1985), Sahari Bagha (1985), Laxman Rekha (1996), and Santana (1998).

Filmography

Actor

Director

External links
 Cinema of Odisha
 List of Odia-language films
 https://www.moviebuff.com/mohammad-mohsin
 https://odishanewsinsight.com/events/10-things-to-know-about-olden-days-of-odia-film-industry/
 https://www.gktoday.in/question/who-is-the-director-of-the-odia-movie-phula-chanda
 https://www.newindianexpress.com/states/odisha/2015/jan/16/Void-in-Villainy-Hara-Patnaik-705753.html
 http://www.odishahistory.com/odia_film.html
 http://jajabara.com/odia-cast-Mohammad-Mohsin-Odisha274Cshwn99bs1s
 http://www.orissacinema.com/history/list_of_oriya_films.html
 https://www.mycitylinks.in/lord-jagannath-s-unwavering-influence-on-ollywood
 http://www.parouse.com/php/SummaryGet.php?FindGo=Oriya_film_industry
 https://www.odishanewstimes.com/2020/08/24/monsoon-sonata-odia-film-sesa-srabana-the-last-monsoon-1976/

References

1942 births
2003 deaths
Male actors from Odisha
Film directors from Odisha
Film producers from Odisha